National Council of Women may be:

 National Council of Women of Australia
 National Council of Women in Burma
 National Council of Women of Canada
 National Council of Women (Chile)
 National Council of Women of Great Britain
 National Council of Women of New Zealand
 National Council of Women of Queensland
 National Council of Women of the United States
 Solomon Islands National Council of Women

See also
 Dutch Women's Council
 International Council of Women
 National Council for Women, Egypt
 National Council of French Women
 National Council of Ghana Women
 National Council of Jewish Women
 National Council of Negro Women
 National Council of Swedish Women
 National Council of Women's Organizations, United States
 National Council of Women's Societies, Nigeria
 National Organization for Women, United States